Sofiane Boufal (born 17 September 1993) is a professional footballer who plays as a winger or attacking midfielder for Qatar club Al-Rayyan. Born in France, he plays for the Morocco national team.

Club career

Angers
Boufal came through the Angers youth system, making his debut for the club at the age of 18, replacing Rayan Frikeche in the closing stages of a 1–0 home loss to Istres in August 2012. He made his first ever professional start the next Ligue 2 season, in a 4–2 win away at Istres, becoming a regular that season, making 31 appearances in all competitions. In the 2014–15 season, he helped Angers win promotion to Ligue 1. He racked up a total of 4 goals in 16 appearances in the first half of the season, before attracting interest from Ligue 1 clubs.

Lille
On 9 January 2015, Boufal transferred to Lille in Ligue 1, instantly making an impression, scoring 3 goals in 14 league games. The next season, he continued to impress, scoring 12 goals in 35 appearances in all competitions and attracted interest from some of the biggest clubs around the world.

Southampton
On 29 August 2016, Southampton announced they had signed Boufal on a five-year contract for a club-record undisclosed fee. The fee was reported as £16 million, slightly more than the £15 million paid to Roma for Dani Osvaldo in October 2013.

In the 2016–17 season, Boufal scored only one League Cup goal and one Premier League goal; his strike in Saints' 26 October 2016 1–0 win over Sunderland in the fourth round of the League Cup won Southampton's Goal of the Season award.

On 21 October 2017, Boufal scored a virtuoso 85th-minute goal in a home tie against West Bromwich Albion to lead his team to a 1–0 victory and send them into the top half of the Premier League. Having come on as a substitute in the 80th minute, he gained possession deep within his own half and took the ball past six opposing players before sending it past keeper Ben Foster from just inside the box. This goal was voted the 2017–18 Premier League Goal of the Season.

In July 2018, Boufal joined La Liga side Celta Vigo on loan for the 2018–19 campaign.

After returning to Southampton for the 2019–20 season, he played in 10 of his team's 13 league games before injuring his toe at his home, when he ran into a kitchen table.

Return to Angers
On 5 October 2020, Boufal returned to his first club Angers on a free transfer.

Al-Rayyan 
On 31 January 2023, Boufal joined Qatar club Al-Rayyan SC on a three-and-a-half-year contract.

International career
Boufal made his debut for the Morocco national team on 26 March 2016 starting in a 1–0 African Cup of Nations qualification victory against Cape Verde.

Boufal withdrew from Morocco's squad for the 2017 Africa Cup of Nations due to injury. He was also unexpectedly omitted from the final squad for the 2018 FIFA World Cup by coach Hervé Renard.

Boufal represented Morocco at the 2019 Africa Cup of Nations. He was one of two Moroccan players to fail to score in their 4–1 penalty shootout defeat to Benin in the Round of 16.

On 10 November 2022, he was named in Morocco's 26-man squad for the 2022 FIFA World Cup in Qatar.

Career statistics

Club

International

Scores and results list Morocco's goal tally first, score column indicates score after each Boufal goal.

Honours
Lille
 Coupe de la Ligue runner-up: 2015–16

Southampton
 EFL Cup runner-up: 2016–17

Individual
 UNFP Player of the Month: April 2016
 Prix Marc-Vivien Foé 2016
 Premier League Goal of the Month: October 2017
 Premier League Goal of the Season: 2017–18
 Goal of the decade at Southampton: 2010–2020
 Angers Player of the Month: August 2021

References

External links

 
 
 

1993 births
Footballers from Paris
Citizens of Morocco through descent
French sportspeople of Moroccan descent
Living people
French footballers
Moroccan footballers
Morocco international footballers
Association football midfielders
Angers SCO players
Lille OSC players
Southampton F.C. players
RC Celta de Vigo players
Al-Rayyan SC players
Ligue 2 players
Championnat National 3 players
Ligue 1 players
Premier League players
La Liga players
2019 Africa Cup of Nations players
2021 Africa Cup of Nations players
2022 FIFA World Cup players
French expatriate footballers
Moroccan expatriate footballers
Expatriate footballers in England
French expatriate sportspeople in England
Moroccan expatriate sportspeople in England
Expatriate footballers in Spain
French expatriate sportspeople in Spain
Moroccan expatriate sportspeople in Spain
Expatriate footballers in Qatar
French expatriate sportspeople in Qatar
Moroccan expatriate sportspeople in Qatar